Roy Peter Martin (5 January 1931 – 23 March 2014) was an English author who wrote primarily under the pseudonyms James Melville and Hampton Charles.

Martin was born in London and studied philosophy at Birkbeck College. He served in the Royal Air Force before a career first in the Royal Festival Hall and then as a diplomat in the British Council based in Japan.

As James Melville he wrote a series of 13 detective novels set in Japan featuring Tetsuo Otani, the fictional Superintendent of Police in Kobe, and several historical novels, including The Imperial Way, which was inspired by the February 26 Incident.  He also wrote three Miss Seeton novels under the pseudonym Hampton Charles, as well as a cook book, Japanese Cooking together with Joan Martin, his second wife.

He wrote a history of the Japanese imperial family, The Chrysanthemum Throne, which was published in the United Kingdom in 1997 by Sutton Publishing Limited and later in the United States by University of Hawai'i Press.

Works

Novels under the pseudonym James Melville 

 The Superintendent Otani Mysteries:
 Wages of Zen (1979)
 The Chrysanthemum Chain (1980)
 A Sort of Samurai (1981)
 The Ninth Netsuke (1982)
 Sayonara, Sweet Amaryllis (1983)
 Death of a Daimyo (1984)
 The Death Ceremony (1985)
 Go Gently, Gaijin (1986)
 Kimono for a Corpse (1988)
 The Reluctant Ronin (1988)
 A Haiku for Hanae (1989)
 The Bogus Buddha (1990)
 The Body Wore Brocade (1992)

Novels under the pseudonym Hampton Charles 

 The Miss Seeton Mysteries:
 Miss Seeton, by Appointment (1990)
 Advantage Miss Seeton (1990)
 Miss Seeton at the Helm (1990)

References

Bibliography

External links
 
 

1931 births
2014 deaths
English writers